Sadovo might refer to:

Sadovo, small town in Sadovo Municipality, Plovdiv Province, central Bulgaria
Sadovo, Blagoevgrad Province, village in Hadzhidimovo Municipality, in Blagoevgrad Province, Bulgaria
Sadovo, Burgas Province, village in Sungurlare Municipality, in Burgas Province, in southeastern Bulgaria
Sadovo, Varna Province, village in the municipality of Avren, in Varna Province, northeastern Bulgaria
Sadovo, Russia, village in Kaliningrad Oblast, Russia
Sadovoe, village in the municipality of Bălţi, northern Moldova
Kallithea Elassonos, a village in Greece that was formerly known as Sadovo

See also
 Sadowo (disambiguation)
 Sadovy (disambiguation)